Myopites nigrescens is a species of tephritid or fruit flies in the genus Myopites of the family Tephritidae.

Distribution
Canary Islands.

References

Tephritinae
Insects described in 1908
Taxa named by Theodor Becker
Diptera of Europe